The Irish Federation of Astronomical Societies (IFAS) is an umbrella group comprising most of the National and Regional Astronomical Societies on the Island of Ireland.

History
IFAS was formed in October 1999 to provide an umbrella organisation for mutual benefit and co-operation for almost all Irish astronomical clubs and societies on the Island of Ireland, north and south.

Since its inception it has formed an on-line community for astronomers though its website.

Currently (July 2014) there are over 2,200 registered users from around the world taking part in over 12,000 different topics of astronomical interest. A monthly, sponsored astrophotography competition allows for people to pursue an added interest and better their skills, and perhaps win a prize.

Structure
The federation council is made up of 2 members from each club/society, regardless of the size of the society.
Out of the council, a Chairman, vice Chairman, Secretary and Treasurer are elected annually. 

The IFAS Constitution details the running of IFAS.

Events
IFAS holds its Annual General Meeting September and October each year.

Member clubs
According to the IFAS constitution, membership is open to any astronomical clubs or societies on the island of Ireland  "which are governed by a democratically elected council or committee".

The current members are:
 
Irish Astronomical Association
Irish Astronomical Society - website: Irish Astronomical Society
Astro2
 Birr Astronomical Society
 Cork Astronomy Club
Deise Astronomy Society
East Antrim Astronomical Society
 Galway Astronomy Club
 National University of Ireland, Galway Astronomy Society
Kerry Astronomy Club
 Kildare Astronomical Society
Midlands Astronomy Club (formerly the Tullamore Astronomical Society)
Shannonside Astronomy Club
 Slaneyside Astronomical Society
South Dublin Astronomical Society

See also
Irish Astronomical Society
List of astronomical societies

References

External links
IFAS Website
 Extensive bulletin boards

Astronomy in Ireland
Astronomy organizations
All-Ireland organisations
1999 establishments in Ireland
Organizations established in 1999